Mönkhtogtokhyn Erdenesaikhan (born 13 December 1982) is a Mongolian international footballer. He made his first appearance for the Mongolia national football team in 2003.

References

1982 births
Mongolian footballers
Mongolia international footballers
Living people
Association football midfielders